Munshi Raisuddin (1901–1973) was a Bangladeshi musician and musicologist. He was awarded Ekushey Padak by the Government of Bangladesh in 1986.

Early life and education
Raisuddin was born in Nakol village in Magura District. His father, Munshi Abbasuddin, was a classical singer. His Pseudonym is Alam piya. Anyone can be thought that its a Hindi name but he is a Bangladeshi. His bandesh is very effective in various raga. Initially, Raisuddin took music lessons from his cousin, Shamsul Haque.

Career
After passing the matriculation examination, Raisuddin moved to Kolkata. At Kolkata he was a disciple of Nulo Gopal. He took lessons on dhrupad and kheyal from Rashbehari Mallick and practised music for twelve years.

Raisuddin returned to Magura and took a job at a cotton mill in Kushtia. He set up a music school. He later completed a course on classical music at the Sangeet Kala Bhavan in Kolkata, a music institution run by Girijashankar Chakraborty. Raisuddin also learnt classical music from Sharajit Kanjilal, a musician of Lucknow.

Musicians Ferdausi Rahman and Milia Ali took lessons from Raisuddin.

Works
 Saral Sabgeet Sar-Sangraha
 Chhotader Sa Re Ga Ma
 Abhinaba Shataraga
 Sangeet Parichay
 Raga Lahari
 Gita Lahari

Awards
 Adamjee Literary Award
 Ekushey Padak (1986)
pride of performance 1967

References

1901 births
1973 deaths
Bangladeshi male writers
People from Magura District
Bangladeshi male musicians
Recipients of the Ekushey Padak in arts
Recipients of the Adamjee Literary Award
20th-century male musicians